Sandeep Jyoti (born 14 December 1973) is an Indian-born Canadian cricketer.

Jyoti was born in Shimla, India, ando migrated to Canada when he was fourteen years old. Upon arrival in Canada, Sandeep joined the Mississauga Ramblers Cricket Club in Mississauga, Ontario.  Here he learned his cricket and is still currently playing for the club where he coaches as well.  Sandeep made his debut for the Canadian National Cricket side in 2002 when he participated in the Red Stripe Bowl in Jamaica.

In 2006, he played for the national team in the America's cup tournament. Sandeep had a good Americas Cup where he had some great opening partnerships with John Davison. Sandeep also had a couple of not out innings vital to Canadian victories.

Sandeep is an opening batsman and a right-arm off-break bowler. His highest batting score for Canada is 117.

References

External links
 Sandeep Jyoti on Cricinfo
 Sandeep Jyoti on Real Champions

1973 births
Living people
Canadian cricketers
Canada One Day International cricketers
Canada Twenty20 International cricketers
Indian cricketers
Indian emigrants to Canada
Indian cricket coaches
Canadian Hindus
People from Shimla
Canadian people of Indian descent
Cricketers from Himachal Pradesh